Aureliano Torres Román (born 16 June 1982) is a Paraguayan former footballer who last played for 12 de Octubre in the Paraguayan División Intermedia. At club level, Torres achieved the 2002 Emperor's Cup in Japan, the Torneo Clausura of the 2006–07 Argentine Primera División and the 2012–13 Uruguayan Primera División of Uruguay, and with Paraguay he achieved the silver medal at the 2004 Summer Olympics Men's tournament and runners-up of the 2011 Copa América.

Club career
Torres was born in Luque. In 2007 he joined San Lorenzo and in his debut season the club won the Clausura tournament. In spite of that, he has not had a good relationship with the supporters, due to his lukewarm performances.

Torres debuted for Sol de América in a 2–2 home draw against Club Rubio Ñú on 16 February 2014. He scored his first goal for Sol de América in a 2–1 home loss against Club Olimpia on 24 August 2014.

In 2015, he and Sol de América colleague Claudio Morel Rodríguez both joined 12 de Octubre of the Division Intermedia.

International career
He scored two goals with Paraguay, the second against Ivory Coast on 30 May 2010.

2004 Summer Olympics – Athens
Aged 22, Aureliano was selected by Paraguay U-23 coach Carlos Jara Saguier for the 2004 Summer Olympics Men's tournament, wearing the number# 11 shirt. Torres had previously participated at the 2004 CONMEBOL Men Pre-Olympic Tournament which saw Paraguay qualify for the Summer Olympics. Torres started in Paraguay's opening group-stage fixture against Japan on 12 August, where he played a full 90-minutes of the 4–3 win. Torres had a 25-yard full stretch shot saved by Japan's goal keeper Hitoshi Sogahata, a few minutes later, Torres got another sight of goal when, from 20-years, he shot the ball into the top corner of the net in the 62nd minute. Torres then featured in Paraguay's second match, a 2–1 defeat against Ghana on 15 August. Torres again played a full 90-minutes in Paraguay's third group-stage fixture on 18 August, providing an inch-perfect cross in the 14th minute for Fredy Bareiro to head the only goal in the 1–0 win against Italy, Torres received a yellow card in the 58th minute. Paraguay finished in first-place of Group B with six points, qualifying for the knockout stages. Torres played in Paraguay's 3–2 quarter-final win against South Korea on 21 August. He then played another 90-minutes in Paraguay's 3–1 semi-final win against Iraq on 24 August. Torres played a full 90-minutes in the final, a 1–0 loss against Argentina on 28 August, Torres received his second yellow card of the tournament in the 72nd minute. Upon finishing runners-up, Paraguay went on to claim silver-medals.

Honours

Club
Kyoto Sanga
Emperor's Cup (1): 2002

San Lorenzo
Torneo de Apertura (1): 2007

Peñarol
Uruguayan Primera División (1): 2012–13

International
 Silver medal (1): 2004
 Copa América (1): Runner–up 2011

Individual
 Domingo Martínez de Irala medal (1): 2010
 Condecoración Especial (1): 2010

References

External links
 
 
 
 Argentine Primera statistics at Fútbol XXI  
 

1982 births
Living people
Paraguayan footballers
Paraguay international footballers
Paraguayan expatriate footballers
Footballers at the 2004 Summer Olympics
Olympic footballers of Paraguay
Olympic silver medalists for Paraguay
Club Sol de América footballers
Deportivo Toluca F.C. players
Irapuato F.C. footballers
Real Murcia players
San Lorenzo de Almagro footballers
Club Guaraní players
Peñarol players
12 de Octubre Football Club players
Segunda División players
Paraguayan Primera División players
Argentine Primera División players
Uruguayan Primera División players
Liga MX players
Expatriate footballers in Argentina
Expatriate footballers in Mexico
Expatriate footballers in Japan
Expatriate footballers in Spain
Expatriate footballers in Uruguay
2004 Copa América players
2007 Copa América players
2011 Copa América players
2010 FIFA World Cup players
Sportspeople from Luque
Olympic medalists in football
Medalists at the 2004 Summer Olympics
Association football defenders